Antioch Township is a township in Hot Spring County, Arkansas, United States. Its total population was 432 as of the 2010 United States Census, an increase of 12.21 percent from 385 at the 2000 census.

According to the 2010 Census, Antioch Township is located at  (34.308717, -92.992549).

References

External links 

Townships in Arkansas
Populated places in Hot Spring County, Arkansas